All Is Calm is the third, and currently final, studio album by American metalcore band Confide. The album was self-released on July 30, 2013.

Track listing

Personnel
 Ross Kenyon – lead vocals
 Joshua Paul – lead guitar, backing vocals
 Jeffrey Helberg – rhythm guitar
 Trevor Vickers – bass guitar, backing vocals
 Joel Piper – drums, clean vocals, keyboards, programming

References

2013 albums
Confide (band) albums
Self-released albums